The Garden City Arena Complex (formerly the "Gatorade Garden City Complex") was a sports complex in St. Catharines, Ontario.  It was the main arena facility in that city from its construction in 1938 until the opening of the Meridian Centre in 2014.

The complex housed two arena pads - the Jack Gatecliff Arena, which was home to the Niagara IceDogs from the 2007–2008 to the 2013–2014 seasons, and the smaller Rex Stimers Arena.  The original section was constructed in 1938, and was named the Garden City Arena.  The facility was later named after local sportswriter Jack Gatecliff after extensive renovations in 1996, that combined the Garden City Arena and Rex Stimers Arena into a single building. The smaller arena was named for Rex Stimers, a popular sportscaster with local radio station CKTB for a period of 32 years beginning in 1934. The complex was renamed the Gatorade Garden City Complex on September 19, 2007 after the naming rights were sold to Gatorade. Upon the expiry of the naming agreement, the complex was renamed the Garden City Arena Complex.

The final capacity of the Jack Gatecliff Arena was 3,145, including standing room.  Seating capacity in the Rex Stimers Arena was 800 seats.

The arena was previously home to the Niagara IceDogs of the OHL, as well as the St. Catharines Jr. B Falcons of the Greater Ontario Junior Hockey League. The Niagara Icedogs moved into the new Meridian Centre for the 2014–15 season. Upon the arenas closure in 2022 the Falcons moved into the already existing Seymour-Hannah Sports and Entertainment Centre for the 2022-23 season. From 1982 to 1986 it was home to Toronto Maple Leafs farm team the St. Catharines Saints of the American Hockey League.

References

External links
 Niagara Ice Dogs Official website
 St. Catharines Falcons 

Indoor arenas in Ontario
Indoor ice hockey venues in Canada
Ontario Hockey League arenas
Sports venues in St. Catharines
PepsiCo buildings and structures
Gatorade
St. Catharines Saints